Fumito (written: 文人, 史人 or 郁人) is a masculine Japanese given name. Notable people with the name include:

, Japanese dive bomber pilot officer 
, Japanese musician
, Japanese television personality
, Japanese video game designer

Japanese masculine given names